Really Want to See You Again is the third single from Australian band Sneaky Sound System's third album From Here to Anywhere. The music video premiered on 16 March on Channel V

Track listing
Digital EP
 Really Want to See You Again
 Really Want to see You Again (Kink remix)
 Really Want to See You Again (Azari & Ill remix)
 Really Want to See You Again (Jam X-Press remix)

Chart performance
The track was sent to radio in December, 2012 and has peaked at #47 on the Australian Airplay Chart. It has so far failed to reach the top 100 ARIA Singles chart.

References

2012 singles
Sneaky Sound System songs
2011 songs
Modular Recordings singles
Songs written by Connie Mitchell